Altrincham College is a non-selective secondary school and sixth form located in Timperley (near Altrincham), Trafford, England. The school is an academy and is part of South Manchester Learning Trust. It  holds the specialist Arts College status.

Description
There are approximately 80 teachers in the school and approximately 1000 pupils.

Buildings
Recent additions in previous years to the school include a large sports hall (on opening the guest of honour was Sir Bobby Charlton) with a fitness suite also a separate building for 2 history rooms and an extra art room. In 2011, a £5.6million sixth form was added onto the school, allowing the school's students to carry on their education in the school from the ages of 11–18 years old. The school is affiliated with Young Enterprise which some pupils are involved in, during year 10 & 11.

References

Secondary schools in Trafford
Academies in Trafford
Altrincham